The Olympia Terminal is a dock in the South Harbour of Helsinki, Finland. It was designed by the Hytönen-Luukkonen architects bureau and opened for the 1952 Summer Olympics.

Today, the terminal has a regular connection to Stockholm, acting as Silja Line's Helsinki terminal. Over 1.5 million passengers travel through the Olympia Terminal annually. A currency exchange point, an ATM and a café are present in the building.

Silja Line’s MS Silja Serenade and MS Silja Symphony operate daily to Stockholm’s Värtahamnen, departing at 17:00.

History 
The , was opened on 16 July 1952, just before the Olympics. The building was designed by architects Aarre Hytönen and Risto-Veikko Luukkonen. SS Bore I was also the first ship to depart from the harbour, as it set off on its return journey at 19:00. The next day,  arrived and the day after that,  arrived. The Olympic pier was first used by cruise ships to Stockholm.

When the Olympia Terminal was completed in 1952, it was visited by over 90,000 passengers annually, but only in summer and autumn. Silja Line started all-year-round traffic from the Olympia Terminal to Stockholm in 1972 and regular traffic to Tallinn in 1995. However, regular traffic to Tallinn from the Olympia Terminal ceased in 2005. The terminal and its ferry docks were renovated in 1989/1990 to handle larger ships.  The facility includes two cruiseferry docks and sets of driving ramps.

Ships serving the terminal

References

External links 

 Port of Helsinki: Olympia Terminal

1952 establishments in Finland
Buildings and structures in Helsinki
Transport in Helsinki
Ports and harbours of Finland